1996 Denmark Open is a darts tournament, which took place in Denmark in 1996.

Results

References

1996 in darts
1996 in Danish sport
Darts in Denmark